iPrice Group Sdn Bhd is a privately owned online shopping aggregator based in Kuala Lumpur, Malaysia. The company is an online aggregator that simplifies a consumers shopping experience by allowing them to browse for products and compare prices from various online stores. iPrice is a funding and investment product of Asia Venture Group and currently operates in seven Asian countries; namely Hong Kong, Singapore, Indonesia, Philippines, Thailand, Vietnam, and Malaysia. As of May 2017, iPrice hosts a catalogue of over 110 million products from over 1000 merchants across the region, including big e-commerce sites like Lazada and Zalora.

History 
Founded in October 2014 in Kuala Lumpur, Malaysia, iPrice expanded in the same year it was founded and became an active player in the e-commerce industry of six other countries: Singapore, Hong Kong, Indonesia, Philippines, Thailand, and Vietnam. The site first started out as a coupon site that offers deals and discounts for other online stores. However, it later changed into a shopping aggregator that helps shoppers compare prices from various e-commerce sites.

Service 
iPrice provides the service of hosting products from several Southeast Asian e-commerce sites on one platform. With claims that it is more than just a price-comparison site as it focuses more on the discovery of products rather than the price of the products, how the site works is that it narrows down the vast volume of products (via a search and filter interface) to find products that would suit the consumer’s preferences.

Traffic volume for e-commerce sites are increased via exposure on the site. The way it works is through clicking the products on the site which redirects consumers (traffic) to the websites that the products are located to complete the purchase. Sites like Hermo and Zalora have reportedly seen an increase in traffic volume since signing on with iPrice and have seen growth in their revenue. Apart from being a platform for several e-commerce sites, iPrice is also considered as a comparison shopping website.

Funding 
iPrice raised its first round of seed funding in May 2015. It received approximately US$550,000 from Asia Venture Group (AVG). The second round of seed funding came in December 2015 when the aggregator announced that it had raised US$1.2 million. This round was led by existing investor, AVG, followed by 500 Startups, IMJ Investment Partners, Venturra Capital, F2 Capital, and Starstrike Ventures. By the end of 2016, iPrice closed a $4 million Series A funding round led by Asia Venture Group (AVG) and Venturra.

Partnerships 
iPrice is a partner of several online sites to provide potential customers with the chance of accessing its money-saving deals and bargains (or more commonly known as coupons).  Its coupons cover a wide range of discounts and offer available for various e-commerce sites, such as Zalora, Lazada, Uber and Foodpanda.  Among the partners currently signed up under this coupon program are Rappler (for the Philippines) as well as two of REV Asia’s Malaysia-based news sites; SAYS

References

Comparison shopping websites
Privately held companies of Malaysia
Internet properties established in 2014
2014 establishments in Malaysia
Companies based in Kuala Lumpur